Aleksandr Diomidovich Rodionov was a sailor from Russia, who represented his native country at the 1912 Summer Olympics in Nynäshamn, Sweden. Rodionov took the bronze in the 10 Metre.

References

Sources

External links
 
 

Male sailors (sport) from the Russian Empire
Sailors at the 1912 Summer Olympics – 10 Metre
Olympic competitors for the Russian Empire
Year of birth missing
Year of death missing